Kromołów may refer to the following places in Poland:
 Kromołów, Silesian Voivodeship
 Kromołów, Opole Voivodeship